Sándor Urbanik (born 15 December 1964 in Esztergom) is a retired male race walker from Hungary. He competed in four consecutive Summer Olympics for his native country, starting in 1988.

Achievements

References
sports-reference

1964 births
Living people
Hungarian male racewalkers
Athletes (track and field) at the 1988 Summer Olympics
Athletes (track and field) at the 1992 Summer Olympics
Athletes (track and field) at the 1996 Summer Olympics
Athletes (track and field) at the 2000 Summer Olympics
Olympic athletes of Hungary
People from Esztergom
Sportspeople from Komárom-Esztergom County